The Fissiphalliidae are a small neotropical family of harvestmen within the suborder Laniatores.

Name
The name of the type genus is combined from Latin fissus "split" and Ancient Greek phallos "penis".

Description
Fissiphalliidae are about two to three millimeters long, with legs ranging from three to almost nine mm. The color ranges from yellowish to pale brownish, sometimes with stripes or dots.

Distribution
Fissiphalliidae have been found in Bogotá, Colombia at elevations of about 3,500 meters, and in lowlands of central and eastern Amazon Rainforest.

Species

 Fissiphallius Martens, 1988
 Fissiphallius chicoi Tourinho & Perez, 2006 - Pará State (Brazil)
 Fissiphallius martensi Pinto-da-Rocha, 2004 - Manaus (Brazil)
 Fissiphallius spinulatus Martens, 1988 — Colombia
 Fissiphallius sturmi Martens, 1988 — Colombia
 Fissiphallius sympatricus Martens, 1988 — Colombia
 Fissiphallius tucupi Tourinho & Perez, 2006 -  Amazonas State (Brazil)

Relationships
Fissiphalliidae could form a monophyletic group with Zalmoxidae, or even be a group within them.

Footnotes

References
 Joel Hallan's Biology Catalog: Fissiphalliidae
  (eds.) (2007): Harvestmen - The Biology of Opiliones. Harvard University Press 

Harvestman families